Under the Whyte notation for the classification of steam locomotives, 0-2-2-0 represents the wheel arrangement of no leading wheels, four powered but uncoupled driving wheels on two axles, and no trailing wheels. Some authorities place brackets around the duplicated but uncoupled wheels, creating a notation 0-(2-2)-0.

Usage
The only recorded usage of the arrangement was in four locomotives designed by Patrick Stirling for the Glasgow and South Western Railway in 1855. The design was not successful and the locomotives were withdrawn by 1867.
The Mount Washington Cog Railway has 8 0-2-2-0's in existence and only 2 are in working order, 3 are in storage, and the rest are on display.

References

 

0-2-2-0
Railway locomotives introduced in 1855